DD Bangla is an Indian Bengali-language free-to-air state-owned television channel owned by state-owned broadcaster Doordarshan Network. It was formerly known as DD-7 and DD National Kolkata. It broadcasts from Kolkata, Shantiniketan and Jalpaiguri. Launched on 9 August 1975, the network's programming consists of soap operas, infotainment series, news and current affairs, social programs and films in Bengali. It is available to 97.1% of the population of West Bengal on terrestrial television.

Programs broadcast by the channel include Bibaho Obhijan, Rongo Tamaasha, Eto sur ar eto gaan, Madhyamik classes among others.

See also
DD Direct Plus
List of programs broadcast by DD National
All India Radio
List of South Asian television channels by country

References

External links
 Doordarshan Official Internet site
 Doordarshan news site
 An article at PFC

Bengali-language television channels in India
Foreign television channels broadcasting in the United Kingdom
Television stations in Kolkata
Television channels and stations established in 1975
Direct broadcast satellite services
Indian direct broadcast satellite services
Doordarshan
1975 establishments in West Bengal